The DCX MMXVI World Tour was the fifth headlining concert tour from American country music trio Dixie Chicks. It started on April 16, 2016, in Antwerp, Belgium and finished on April 18, 2017, in London, Ontario, Canada. This tour is the first time in ten years the band has toured the United States and Australia as a headlining act. It is the first time the band will perform in New Zealand. For the shows in 2017, the tour was renamed the DCX MMXVII World Tour. The was the last tour where they went by the Dixie Chicks.

The sound of the show is more guitar and rock and roll driven than earlier shows, with re-worked Dixie Chicks classics and several covers by Patty Griffin, Lana Del Rey, Beyoncé, and Bob Dylan. Through large video projections several political and empowering messages are spread.

Background
In June 2015, the group announced that they would tour Europe in April 2016, additional dates were announced in August. North American dates were announced in November 2015. Due to demand additional North American dates were announced on May 2, 2016. The Oceania leg was announced in October 2016.

Show synopsis
The stage is set up as a classic stage with a big bars-shaped light rail that is pulled up during the opening song, revealing a large video screen. The Dixie Chicks are supported by a big band with a strong rock and roll sound.
After a warm-up song, the band starts with a strong guitar version of "The Long Way Around", following "Lubbock or Leave It" featuring a trucker and rock and roll themed video. After the first of several Patty Griffin covers, a slowed down version of "Easy Silence" is performed with slow landscape shots and on-screen lyrics. After "Favorite Year" and "Long Time Gone", an acoustic cover of "Video Games" by Lana Del Rey follows. "Goodbye Earl" is another renewed version into a more guitar driven sound. During "Goodbye Earl" a video on domestic violence is shown, including Chris Brown, the Fritzl case and Donald Trump. A video interlude shows the Dixie Chicks in a video game-themed car race, while the instrumental cover of "Ace of Spades" is heard.

The show is split with a bluegrass acoustic segment, starting with "Travelin' Soldier", played by only the three core members of the band. After "Don't Let Me Die in Florida" and "White Trash Wedding", the touring band is introduced. The acoustic segment is closed with an instrumental medley, including Beyoncé's "Single Ladies (Put a Ring on It)" and "Seven Nation Army" by the White Stripes.

"Ready to Run" is themed as an election year parody, with a montage of Hillary Clinton and  Donald Trump, while confetti is blown over the audience. Two more covers are performed: Bob Dylan's "Mississippi" and their version of "Landslide" by Fleetwood Mac.

After "Silent House", "I Like It", "Cowboy Take Me Away" and "Wide Open Spaces" the show is concluded with "Sin Wagon". The encore starts with a dark version of "Not Ready to Make Nice" and a final encore is a positive and empowering message from Ben Harper's "Better Way", closed off by a drum segment.

Opening acts

Augustana
The Heavy 
Anderson East  
Josh Herbert
Elle King 
Smooth Hound Smith
Vintage Trouble
Avalanche City

Recordings
At the second to last show in the U.S. on October 8, 2016, Natalie Maines announced: "As you can see we've chosen you guys and the forum to be the audience for our DVD". The Edmonton, Calgary, Los Angeles, Melbourne and Hamilton shows were included in a one-night cinema event DCX MMXVI Live that was shown in theatres on August 7, 2017, followed by a DVD/Blu-ray/CD release on September 1, 2017, from Columbia Records.

Setlist

"The Long Way Around"
"Lubbock or Leave It"
"Truth #2" 
"Easy Silence"
 "Everybody Knows" / "Favorite Year" / "Some Days You Gotta Dance"
"Long Time Gone"
"Video Games"  / "Nothing Compares 2 U" (
"Top of the World"
"Goodbye Earl"
"Travelin' Soldier" 
"Daddy Lessons" (
"Don't Let Me Die in Florida" 
"White Trash Wedding" 
"Ready to Run"
"Mississippi" 
"Landslide" 
"Silent House"
"I Like It"
"Cowboy Take Me Away"
"Wide Open Spaces"
"Sin Wagon"
Encore
"Not Ready to Make Nice"
"Better Way" 

Notes

Tour dates

Notes

Critical reception
Anastasia Verleysen of the Het Nieuwsblad says, "The Dixie Chicks are not just singing some country, but ladies with balls on their backs and even a high rock 'n roll content. And yet, their songs always go back to basics with the nonchalant banjo-strumming Emily Robinson, Martie Maguire handsome violin lines and the impressive voice of Natalie Maines." The Daily Telegraph'''s Sarah Carson stated, "the triumphant trio proved the power lies in their musicianship, not notoriety, and their talents remain as rich and fierce as ever."
Erik Leijon for Montreal Gazette'' wrote about the 2017 leg of the tour: "Saturday night's set was a reminder that beyond having the courage to speak openly, the Dixie Chicks possess the heart-stopping harmonies, bluegrass stompers, superstar presence and enviable pop instincts to back up any words."

References

2016 concert tours
2017 concert tours
The Chicks concert tours